Doctor Will Magnus is a fictional character appearing in American comic books published by DC Comics.

Publication history
He first appeared in Showcase #37 alongside his creations, the Metal Men and was created by Robert Kanigher and Ross Andru.

Fictional character biography
One of the most impressive geniuses of the DC Universe with doctorates in theoretical mathematics, mechanical engineering, and particle physics, William Maxwell "Will" Magnus often offers scientific advice to other characters. His greatest achievement is the one for which he first received renown: the creation of the Metal Men. The method through which Doc Magnus created the Metal Man has varied over years with various writers. At first they were just blank slate robots with responsometers, devices which generated their intelligence and personalities which just happened to be evocative of the metals from which they were formed.

In an attempt to boost sales of the comic book, the characters underwent vast changes. The Metal Men all assumed human alter egos, while Doc Magnus became a fugitive scientist dedicated to global conquest. His personality change was credited to having been kidnapped, reawakened, and brainwashed by a mad dictator. Sales plunged instead and the comic was not printed for a few years. Eventually Metal Men was picked up again with Doc's sanity restored and he returned to assist his Metal Men.

At one point he saved Doom Patrol's Robotman, whose original body had been destroyed by Madame Rouge. Doc Magnus recovered Robotman's brain and built him a new cybernetic body.

In 1993, a four-part Metal Men miniseries retconned much of their backstory. It was revealed that the responsometers were not responsible for the Metal Men's sentience and that the Metal Men actually were imprinted with the intellects and personalities of real people: Magnus' own brother Mike, his fiancee Sharon, two lab workers Redmond Wilde and Randy Pressman, a janitor named Thomas Tinkham, and a pizza-delivery man named Jack. These unfortunate personalities were accidentally transferred to blank robots in a lab accident. At the climax of the miniseries, Gold, one of his robots, was permanently killed and Doc Magnus mortally wounded. Doc permanently transferred his personality into a blank robot known as Veridium, made of a green alien metal, becoming the new robotic leader of the Metal Men.

52
With the advent of Identity Crisis, Gold is back and Doc Magnus is once again human and played an active role in the series 52.

As revealed during Infinite Crisis, when Superboy-Prime pounded on the walls of reality, he caused the very fabric of reality to shift, changing and merging histories. The "blank robots with responsometers" origin is said to be the definitive origin while the "human personalities" origin and the 1993 miniseries has been described as the byproduct of a mental breakdown suffered by Magnus. When Booster Gold visited, asking for help with Skeets, Magnus commented that the Metal Men "don't quite work anymore".

The responsometers are now described as containing an "artificial soul" invented by Doc Magnus, as inspired by T. O. Morrow, who is revealed to have taught him at college and to have been the only one not to laugh at Magnus's theories. After the unexplained dismantling of the Metal Men, Doc Magnus is unable to recreate these souls and restore their personalities. He now takes Prozac for the bipolar disorder which caused his nervous breakdown and the depression which led to the creation of the Plutonium Man, a tremendous, nearly indestructible superweapon based upon the Metal Men, but with Magnus' then-own deranged, twisted worldview as its operating system. It is implied that although the medication is keeping Magnus from doing anything irrational, it is also deadening his imagination and creativity and that this is the reason he cannot recreate the Metal Men.

Magnus is approached by government agents hoping to use the Metal Men as soulless smart weapons, an offer Magnus rejects. Through all of this, Magnus visits Morrow in his cell in Haven. Morrow warns Magnus that there have been numerous abductions of "mad" scientists, including Doctor Sivana, whose lair Magnus investigates.

Eventually Morrow himself disappears, leaving a note for his former student with a string in machine code. Using the code, Magnus is able to revive Mercury, but his robotic friend and creation is apparently destroyed again while trying to save him from the conspiracy trying to kidnap every mad scientist in the DCU.

During Week 22, mindless replicas of the Metal Men force Magnus to escape from his burned house before he is captured by what is revealed to be a separate group "Chang Tzu's Science Squad". This would be the second time Magnus has confronted Chang Tzu. A previous incarnation of the villain once managed to brainwash the Metal Men, but their loyalty to Magnus restored their rightful minds.

This group is based on Oolong Island (said to be part of the territory of China) and has been responsible for the disappearing scientists (including Professor Morrow). The group is being financed by Intergang with the collusion, it is implied, of the Chinese government. The assembled scientists have been given unlimited budgets to invent various super weapons including, in particular, various types of robots.

During Week 23, a giant robot, piloted by animals from Intergang, delivers Doc Magnus to Oolong Island.

Magnus is assigned to design and construct a new Plutonium Man robot, but deliberately makes little progress, saying to Morrow that the original Plutonium Man was an expression of his pain and rage brought on by his mental illness and that the reason he takes his medication is to prevent himself from doing something like that again. Morrow reveals this to the Island's leaders and Magnus's medication is confiscated.

Magnus then proceeds to work on Plutonium Man, saying this time he will "do it right". Though he is unstable due to his lack of medication, Magnus is not fully co-operating with Chang Tzu. Magnus goes about scavenging materials from various items (gold from a gold watch, lead from lead shielding, mercury from thermometers, and tin from cans of baked beans which he adopts as his sole diet - presumably in order to ensure the other scientists will not want to spend too much time with him, as well). This allows him to reconstruct his Metal Men, albeit only a few inches high. These new Metal Men are shown to help Magnus remain sane despite being off his pills, such as when they persuade him to deactivate the now completed Plutonium Man after he turns it on during a period of depression.

Ooolong Island is attacked by the JSA seeking to rescue Black Adam, and Chang Tzu orders the Plutonium Man activated. Chang notes that he has been spying on Magnus and knows that several metals have entered the lab and not come back out. The Metal Men attack Chang Tzu, allowing Magnus to escape and switch off the Island's defenses. While he does this Morrow confronts Magnus and destroys Mercury, yet again. Magnus explains to Morrow why it's pointless to stop him from deactivating the shields as the JSA will get in eventually, and instead offers him the chance to teleport out, saying that Morrow was "the best teacher I ever knew" and that he tries "to over look the psychopathic super villain thing". Morrow accepts the offer.

Magnus is then confronted by Chang Tzu whom he apparently kills with the aid of Lead and what he describes as a particle wave ray gun. Magnus also indicates this shooting was a result of his irrationality, brought on by the lack of his medications. Magnus then surrenders to the JSA.

With all charges against him dropped, due to being coerced into collaboration, Will Magnus returns to his home and laboratory. There, when Booster Gold visits him again, exactly one year after their last meeting, with a salvaged responsometer containing Skeets' "memself", asking him to somehow restore the robot destroyed by Mister Mind, Magnus agrees. He reveals to have in his possession a copy of Skeets' memories, and so he is able to rebuild him as a security droid 2.0, slightly more advanced, but oblivious of the events of the past years.

Now sane again, he returns to working on his Metal Men.

Superman/Batman
In the Superman/Batman series Doc Magnus is shown working again with his Metal Men. He has even built a new one, the spunky and wisecracking gynoid Copper. Despite contrary advice from his fiancée he asks Bruce Wayne for a tryout of his Metal Men as security guards. The trial is successful, but the Metal Men fail on the field, due to mistrust by the human personnel and Brainiac's influence, leaving Doc Magnus the responsibility of saving the day.

JLA
Magnus has recently assisted the Justice League of America with the rebuilding of Red Tornado. After Red Tornado's first intended body is stolen by Amazo, he is called on again to provide Red Tornado with yet another new body, more powerful and advanced than the previous one. Despite his good intentions, the attempts comes to another downfall, and almost spells his death, when Amazo returns to claim the newer and stronger body for himself.

Metal Men (2009)
The Metal Men are later restored as a second feature in the revamped Doom Patrol (5th series), written by Keith Giffen. Now living in simple suburbia in Kanigher Street, the Metal Men seem to be affected by his currently, partly deranged, state of mind. Iron seems unaffected, Gold is now humorously self-obsessed and magniloquent, Platina is lovesick, Lead is dimwitted and prone to errors, Tin is always scared and affected by chronic self-esteem issues, and Mercury, once brilliant and humorous, has now developed the same bipolar disturbance affecting Will Magnus himself, and refuses to take medications. Copper, the newest and seventh member, is disturbingly ignored by her teammates, who often refuse to acknowledge her presence despite being side by side with her.

The New 52
In The New 52 timeline, Will Magnus is first mentioned in the Forever Evil storyline. A rebuilt Cyborg heads out to find Will Magnus so that he can learn about his "Metal Men" project. Meeting with Will Magnus, Cyborg learns that he can not help him. Magnus tells him the history of the Metal Men project, how they were built to execute search and rescue missions that humans could not tackle. After he was able to get them online, the government went back on their word and chose to have the Metal Men become assassins. The Metal Men hid at Magnus' apartment where they help protect Magnus and the population from an experiment gone wrong, destroying themselves in the process. Seeing their responsometers that control them in Magnus' lab, Cyborg senses that their minds and hearts are still active encouraging Magus to activate them once more to help him.

When the Conner Kent version of Superboy shows up asking for help, Superman gathers all the geniuses he knows, including, but not limited to, Mister Terrific, Batman, Ted Kord and Will Magnus. Examination of Conner leads the group to ponder evidence that the universe has been rebooted at least three times.

Powers and abilities
 While human, Doc Magnus had no special abilities aside from his great intellect. His vast intelligence was responsible for the creation of the Metal Men, along with various other robots.
 While he was Veridium, Magnus was the most powerful of the Metal Men. He could store and channel heat and energy.

Other versions
 In the Amalgam Comics universe, Will Magnus, jealous of his brother Erik for constantly outshining his scientific accomplishments with his Metamutant abilities, created the Sentinels to hunt down Metamutants.
 Will Magnus is featured in the Smallville Season 11 digital comic based on the TV series.

In other media

Television
 Dr. William Magnus appears in the Batman: The Brave and the Bold, voiced by Corey Burton.
 Dr. Will Magnus appears in the "Metal Men" segment of DC Nation Shorts, voiced again by Corey Burton.

Film
 Dr. Will Magnus appeared in Justice League: The New Frontier, voiced by Townsend Coleman.
 An alternate reality version of Will Magnus appeared in Justice League: Gods and Monsters, voiced by C. Thomas Howell. In his college years, he attempted to help Kirk Langstrom devise a serum to cure the latter's cancer, only to turn Langstrom into a pseudo-vampire. A year after this, Magnus accidentally beat his wife Tina to death after realizing she preferred Langstrom over him. This prompted Magnus to set out to try to end all human conflict, believing there was no hope in humanity if a rational man like himself could do something so violent. By the present, his Metal Men framed his universe's Justice League for the deaths of various scientists and forced them out of their base so he can use Superman's ship and a series of miniature Boom Tubes to plant nanites in the minds of every human on Earth, connecting them to a collective consciousness. However, Lex Luthor discovered and reveals the truth to the Justice League and military, allowing them to destroy Magnus' equipment and Metal Men. With his plan foiled, a regretful Magnus commits suicide by disintegrating himself with a nanite sphere.
 Dr. Will Magnus appears in DC Super Hero Girls: Intergalactic Games, voiced by Phil LaMarr.

Video games
Will Magnus appears in DC Universe Online, as a vendor in the Watchtower's Tech Wing.

References

External links
 Toonopedia's Metal Men entry
 Will Magnus in 52 week 14

DC Comics male superheroes
DC Comics scientists
Fictional characters with bipolar disorder
Fictional mathematicians
Fictional mechanical engineers
Fictional physicists
Fictional roboticists
Fictional suicides
Metal Men